Phil Sgrosso (born September 16, 1985) is an American heavy metal musician, best known as the rhythm guitarist of the American metalcore band As I Lay Dying, the former rhythm guitarist of the band Wovenwar and the touring lead guitarist for Saosin and Nails.

Career
Before joining the band that jumpstarted his musical career, Sgrosso was a part of a local act known as Tomra, a melodic metalcore band from San Diego, which disbanded in 2003. Joining As I Lay Dying at the age of 17, Sgrosso had honed his creative talents as one of the songwriters on 2005's Shadows Are Security. His work with the band extends from solely instrumentation, with producing credits on the bands latter releases.

Throughout his tenure with As I Lay Dying, the band was named "Artist of the Year" at the San Diego Music Awards in 2005, 2007, and 2008, and was nominated for a Grammy Award for the song "Nothing Left" in 2008. Sgrosso received the "Ultimate Metal God" award from MTV2 in 2007. Through six studio albums and one split release, As I Lay Dying sold more than 1,000,000 albums worldwide, with their DVD, This Is Who We Are, being Certified Gold within one month of its release. As I Lay Dying's sixth album, Awakened, was released on September 25, 2012 to high critical acclaim.

Following the incarceration of As I Lay Dying vocalist Tim Lambesis in 2013, the remaining members of the band formed Wovenwar with Oh, Sleeper guitarist Shane Blay. They released their debut album, Wovenwar, in 2014 via Metal Blade Records. As I Lay Dying reunited in June 2018.

While touring on the Mayhem Festival in 2012, Sgrosso pulled double-duty performing with As I Lay Dying and Slipknot, filling in for Jim Root on the first leg of the run. Beginning in 2016, he became a permanent fixture to Saosin's touring lineup, taking over after Justin Shekoski's departure. Sgrosso is also a touring guitar player for American powerviolence band Nails. Sgrosso also has a band called Poison Headache with him playing guitars, bass, and vocals, Andy Kutka (formerly of Internal Affairs) on vocals and guitar and Kyle Rosa (formerly of Thieves and Liars) on drums and they are signed to Metal Blade Records.

Discography 

As I Lay Dying
 Shadows Are Security (2005)
 A Long March: The First Recordings  (compilation, 2006)
 An Ocean Between Us (2007)
 The Powerless Rise (2010)
 Decas (compilation, 2011)
 Awakened (2012)
 Shaped by Fire (2019)

Wovenwar
 Wovenwar (2014)
 Honor Is Dead (2016)

Poison Headache
 Poison Headache (2016)

References 

Living people
American heavy metal guitarists
1985 births
American performers of Christian music
As I Lay Dying (band) members
Wovenwar members
21st-century American guitarists